Salt Lake School is a co-educational school situated in Salt Lake City, Kolkata, India. This institution not only focuses on the academics ,but also sports and several other co-curricular aspects of the students.

About School
It is one of the most reputed and the oldest schools in Salt Lake. The school started from the academic year of 1979. The Govt. Of West Bengal in consideration of the need of multilingual population of Salt Lake City, sponsored Salt Lake School(Eng.Medium).

On 1 September 1981, the management of the school was handed over to Salt Lake School (Eng. Medium) Society, constituted guardians, teachers, and staff of the school.

The school is managed by an Executive Council. Students are prepared for the Indian Certificate of Secondary Education (I.C.S.E) and Indian School Certificate Examination (I.S.C) under the Council for The Indian School Certificate Examinations.

The school has classes from pre-primary  level to class XII. The first batch of students appeared for the I.C.S.E exam from this school in March 1987 and for the I.S.C Exam in 1991. The school continues to be under the general supervision and guidance of the Deputy Director of School Education, (Anglo-Indian), Government of West Bengal.

The school has received a grant for setting up of Atal Tinkering Laboratory at the school premises.

Eminent Students who have studied here including Diptarka Hait (IChO Gold Medalist). IOI Silver medalist and ISEF finalist Rajarshi Basu and IOAA Silver medalist Saswata Banerjee also call this school their Alma Mater. Swastik Biswas,an alumnus of Salt Lake School have secured an all-India rank of 5 in KVPY-2017 Exam  (Kishore Vaigyanik Protsahan Yojana Exam), is currently a BS-MS student of Indian Institute of Science Education and Research, Pune.

See also
Education in India
List of schools in India
Education in West Bengal

References

External links

Primary schools in West Bengal
High schools and secondary schools in West Bengal
Schools in Kolkata
Educational institutions established in 1979
1979 establishments in West Bengal